Sky Switzerland is a Swiss media company based in Neuchâtel, which supplies over-the-top pay television and video on demand accessible through the Internet in Switzerland.

History
In May 2017, Sky Deutschland purchased Swiss online-video service HollyStar and its owner Homedia. Now as Sky Switzerland, it subsequently launched Sky Sport as an OTT service in Switzerland, followed by an OTT entertainment service known as Sky Show in 2018.

Sky Sport 

In August 2017, Sky Deutschland announced it would launch Sky Sport in Switzerland as an OTT provider on 17 August 2017. Sky Sport channels are also available via Liberty Global-owned UPC Switzerland, previously only available on Swisscom-owned provider Teleclub.

On 18 September 2018, it was announced that Sky Switzerland would enter a partnership with UPC Switzerland-owned Mysports, which owns the rights to a number of domestic competitions including the ice hockey National League. Via an additional subscription, all MySports channels can be streamed on Sky Switzerland.

Sky Show 

In March 2018, the provider launched Sky Show as a Netflix competitor, featuring dubbed and original language versions of popular Sky programming for a monthly subscription.

Channels 
In addition to individual programmes, streams of the following channels are also available:

Sky Store 

On 3 December 2018, Sky's video-on-demand service Sky Store launched in Switzerland. Unlike Sky Show, which is a subscription service, you can purchase individual series or episodes on Sky Store.

References

External links
Sky Switzerland
Sky Show

Television in Switzerland
Television in Liechtenstein
Telecommunications in Switzerland
Direct broadcast satellite services
German-language television networks
Sky Group